Wizard Entertainment Inc., formerly known as GoEnergy and Wizard World, is a producer of multi-genre fan conventions across North America. The company started as the holding company for Strato Malmas' interests in the energy business.

Gareb Shamus started the previous bearer of the Wizard Entertainment name in 1991 as Wizard Press the publisher of one monthly magazine (Wizard). That company evolved into a multi-title publishing company with diversified interests in branded products and related convention operations. By 2011, the company had discontinued its print division to focus exclusively on its convention business. Since then, they have expanded to producing thirteen annual conventions around the U.S.

History
Gareb Shamus founded Wizard magazine in January 1991 shortly after he graduated from college. The company was originally based in Congers, New York.

Wizard purchased the Chicago Comicon  in 1997 to expand from its core publishing business into trade/consumer conventions.

In December 2007, Darren Sanchez was named Vice President of Production at Wizard Entertainment.

On December 7, 2010, GoEnergy acquired Kick the Can Corp.

Shamus was pushed out as company CEO in late 2011; his position was taken in March 2012 by John Macaluso.

In 2015, the company lost $4.25 million in revenue and would be cutting back from 25 events to 19 events in 2016.  Less than a week after the announcement of the loss, John Macaluso resigned as CEO and was replaced by John Maatta.

Publishing 
Wizard started as a price guide to comics but evolved into focusing squarely on pop-culture, specifically targeting young adult males. (The magazine ultimately featured a price guide to comics and action figures in the back of the magazine.) With its high-end production values and embodiment of the comic speculator boom, Wizard was an instant hit, with a monthly circulation of more than 100,000 copies.

The magazine also spawned several ongoing magazines dedicated to similar interests, such as ToyFare: The Toy Magazine, for toys and action figures; Inquest Gamer, for collectible game cards; Anime Insider for anime and manga; and Toy Wishes for mainstream toy enthusiasts.

Anime Insider folded in the spring of 2009. On January 24, 2011, after 20 years of publication, the company announced that Wizard would cease print publication and become an all-digital magazine called Wizard World, launching in February 2011. At that point Wizard Entertainment also ceased publication of its sister magazine, ToyFare.

Black Bull Entertainment 
In 2000, Wizard founder Gareb Shamus forayed into the world of actual comic book publishing, creating the imprint Black Bull Entertainment, featuring several well-known creators, including Mark Waid, Chris Eliopoulos, Nelson DeCastro, and Garth Ennis. The first Black Bull title was the miniseries Gatecrasher: Ring of Fire. Black Bull's titles included:

 Beautiful Killer (2002–2003), #1–3
 Gatecrasher (2000–2001), #1–6
 Gatecrasher: Ring of Fire (2000), #1–4
 Just a Pilgrim (2001), #1–5
 Just a Pilgrim: Garden of Eden (2002), #1–4
 The New West (2005), #1–2
 Shadow Reavers'' (2001–2002), #1–5

Conventions 

Just a few years after purchasing the Chicago Comicon in 1996, the now renamed "Wizard World Chicago" event boasted a weekend attendance of over 58,000 people.

In May 2002, Wizard branched out from Chicago and produced "Wizard World East" at the Pennsylvania Convention Center. And in 2003 the company produced "Wizard World Texas;" adding "Wizard World Los Angeles" in 2004, and "Wizard World Boston" in 2005.

In 2005, Wizard announced that it would be holding a comic book convention in Atlanta from June 30–July 2, 2006, the same dates on which the long-running Charlotte, North Carolina-based Heroes Convention was scheduled to take place. This caused an outcry amongst the comic book community, as Atlanta is only  a four-hour drive from Charlotte, and several comic book creators voiced concerns about an attempt by a large, corporate event to force out an independent comic book convention. As a result of the outcry, many comic book creators, including Warren Ellis, Bryan Hitch, Greg Rucka, Tony Harris, Scott Kurtz, Gaijin Studios and Art Adams, signed up to appear at HeroesCon 2006. In mid-August 2005, Wizard announced that it would be pushing back the Atlanta convention until 2007.

In 2008, Wizard began adding an academic forum called "Wizard World University" to include scholarly panels at their conventions, beginning with the November convention in Arlington, Texas.

In 2009, Wizard canceled the Texas event and postponed the Los Angeles convention.

In 2009, Wizard World acquired the Big Apple Comic Con, New York City's longest-running comic book, science fiction, fantasy, horror, and pop culture convention. Wizard gave up the New York market after 2013 due to the dominance of the New York Comic Con, produced by ReedPop, a division of Reed Exhibitions and Reed Elsevier. The Big Apple con is now back in the hands of its founder, Michael Carbonaro.

In 2009, Wizard World also acquired the Paradise Comics Toronto Comicon.

Wizard Entertainment's 2010 North American Comic Con tour included city stops in Toronto, Anaheim, Philadelphia, Chicago, New York City, Austin, and Boston.

Wizard's 2013 conventions included Portland Comic Con, St. Louis Comic Con, Philadelphia Comic Con, NYC Experience, Chicago Comic Con, Ohio Comic Con, Nashville Comic Con, Austin Comic Con, and New Orleans Comic Con.  In September 2013, Wizard World announced seven new stops for the 2014 tour: Sacramento, Louisville, Minneapolis, Atlanta, San Antonio, Richmond, and Tulsa.

Over time, Wizard World reduced the number of conventions they would hold each year, down to only 6 by 2021. In August 2021, Wizard World announced they would be selling the convention events business to FanExpo, with the final Wizard World Chicago show occurring in October.

References

External links
 

Comic book publishing companies of the United States
Defunct comics and manga publishing companies
Magazine publishing companies of the United States
Comics conventions in the United States
Publishing companies established in 1991
1991 establishments in New York (state)
Conventions in New York City